Kung Fu Mahjong is a 2005 Hong Kong comedy film directed by Wong Jing and Billy Chung. It is about an obsessive gambler Chi Mo Sai (Yuen Wah) and Auntie Fei (Yuen Qiu). The film was followed by two sequels, Kung Fu Mahjong 2 which was released the same year as the first film, and Kung Fu Mahjong 3: The Final Duel, which was released in 2007.

Plot
Chi Mo Sai (Yuen Wah) meets Wong (Roger Kwok) in Auntie Fei's (Yuen Qiu) cafe and learns that Wong has a photographic memory. He decides to exploit this by teaching him how to play Mahjong, but Fei, Wong's boss, strongly objects. Despite Fei's objections, Wong learns Mahjong from compulsive gambler Chi Mo Sai. He impresses triad boss Tin Kau Ko (Wong Jing), but falls in love with Tin's mistress (Theresa Fu) and is beaten by his men. Wong goes crazy. Luckily, Fei cures him using Mahjong. Fei wants Wong to beat Tin in the climatic "King of Mahjong" competition.

It is the only 2005 film to boast of having a sequel made in 2005. The budget of the first two films are considerably smaller than Kung Fu Hustle.

Characters

Auntie Fei
Owner of Fei's cafe. Previously the Queen of Mahjong. Retired because someone stabbed her fiancé.

Chi Mo Sai
An obsessive gambler. Gambling was his job. Kicked out during  the mahjong competition due to scolding others.

Wong
Wong is a young man with photographic memory. He works in Fei's cafe. Chi Mo Sai taught him mahjong. He was the champion of the 2005 "King of Mahjong" Competition.

Tin Kau Ko
A cheat and triad boss. Knows the skill of fat mantis style. Draws six tiles instead of one during a mahjong game. He's the main antagonist of the film and later, supportive character in the sequel.

Reception

Box office
The film opened on 2 June 2005 in Hong Kong at the top of the box office, grossing US$337,363 (HK $2,625,258) in its first week.

External links 
 
 

2005 films
2000s Cantonese-language films
Hong Kong action comedy films
Films about gambling
Hong Kong martial arts films
China Star Entertainment Group films
Films directed by Wong Jing
Triad films
2000s Hong Kong films